Athenry railway station serves the town of Athenry in County Galway.

The station lies on the Dublin to Galway intercity service and Galway to Limerick and Galway to Athenry commuter services.

Passengers for Westport and Ballina travel to Athlone and change trains.

It was once connected to Tuam and Claremorris in the north. This service may be resumed (see Western Rail Corridor).

History
The station was opened on 1 August 1851, by the Midland Great Western Railway.  In November 2016, it was announced the station could lose its connection to Ennis again by 2018 with the closure of the Ennis to Athenry line to save money.

See also
 List of railway stations in Ireland

References

External links
Irish Rail: Athenry Station

1851 establishments in Ireland
Railway Station
Iarnród Éireann stations in County Galway
Railway stations in County Galway
Railway stations opened in 1851
Railway stations in the Republic of Ireland opened in 1851